Meuse is a  replenishment oiler (PCE) of the French Navy. Constructed by the Brest Arsenal in Brest, France, the vessel was launched on 2 December 1978 and entered service in 1980. The tanker served on several overseas operations, often operating with France's aircraft carriers in a support role. Meuse was taken out of service on 16 December 2015.

Development and design

In French service, the first two  tankers were called Pétrolier Ravitailleur d'Escadre (PRE, "fleet replenishment oiler"). The first two ships were built to a similar design with different capabilities of the following three. The first two ships carry two cranes abaft the bridge.

They have two dual solid/liquid underway transfer stations per side and can replenish two ships per side and one astern. Of those four stations, two of them are SYTAR stations. These numbers change with the needs of the fleet.

The Durance-class tankers all mount a flight deck over the stern and a hangar. The ships utilise Aérospatiale Alouette III and Westland Lynx helicopters but are capable of operating larger ones from their flight deck. For defence, Meuse initially mounted one Bofors 40 mm/L60 anti-aircraft (AA) gun in a single gun turret and two single-mounted /70 calibre Mk. 10 Mod 23 AA guns. The ship is equipped with two DRBN 34 navigational radars, a Telegon HF/DF system, Thales DR-2000 intercept radar and an SLQ-25 Nixie towed torpedo decoy system. The armament was later altered by removing the 20 mm guns and adding four  M2 Browning machine guns and three launchers for Simbad Mistral surface-to-air missiles. The ship has a complement of 163 and is capable of accommodating 45 personnel.

Construction and career
The second tanker of the Durance class was laid down on 2 June 1977 at the Brest Arsenal in Brest, France. She was launched on 2 December 1978 and given the pennant number A 607. Meuse was commissioned into the French Navy on 8 August 1980 or 21 November 1980. The Durance-class ships were assigned to the Force d'action navale (FAR, "Naval Action Force") after entering service and based at Toulon.

She was deployed in Opération Daguet, the French contribution to the Gulf War in 1991. She participated in Opération Trident in 1999 with Foch supporting Kosovo. Meuse took part in Mission Héraclès in 2001 with the aircraft carrier  as part of the War in Afghanistan. As part of Opération Agapanthe the tanker operated off India in 2010–2011 with Charles de Gaulle and again with the aircraft carrier in Opération Harmattan in 2011. Meuse was assigned to Opération Chammal in January 2015 with Charles de Gaulle. She was decommissioned on 16 December 2015.

Notes

Citations

References

External links

 History of Meuse at netmarine.net

1978 ships
Durance-class tankers
Ships built in France